The Via Hadriana was an ancient Roman road established by the emperor Hadrian, which stretched from Antinoöpolis on the River Nile to the Red Sea at Berenice Troglodytica (Berenike). Hadrian had founded Antinoöpolis in memory of his presumed lover, the youth Antinous, who had drowned in the Nile. The Via Hadriana was finished in 137 AD. Traces of the road line were noted by Couyat (1910) and Murray (1925) who recorded the sites of several small  in the southern part of the road. However, few were in the north and none at all were on the west-east stretch between Antinoöpolis and the coast. Many of these road stations had fortified watering points (hydreumata), which are likely to have given their name to the Hadhramaut on the other side of the Red Sea.

References

External links
Map
 2001 map

Roman roads in Africa
Ancient Roman buildings and structures in Egypt
Hadrian
137 establishments
130s establishments in the Roman Empire
2nd-century establishments in Egypt